Annie is a soundtrack album for the 1999 film of the same name.

Track listing
 "Overture / Main Titles" - Instrumental
 "Maybe" - Alicia Morton
 "It's the Hard Knock Life" - Alicia Morton and Orphans
 "It's the Hard Knock Life" (Reprise) - Orphans
 "Tomorrow" - Alicia Morton
 "Little Girls" - Kathy Bates
 "I Think I'm Gonna Like It Here" - Audra McDonald, Alicia Morton and Company
 "NYC" - Victor Garber, Audra McDonald, Alicia Morton, and Star-to-Be
 "NYC (Reprise) / Lullaby" - Victor Garber
 "Easy Street" - Alan Cumming, Kathy Bates, and Kristin Chenoweth
 "You're Never Fully Dressed Without a Smile" (Radio Version) - Bert Healy and the Boylan Sisters
 "You're Never Fully Dressed Without a Smile" (Cast Version) - Orphans
 "Something Was Missing" - Victor Garber
 "I Don't Need Anything But You" - Victor Garber and Alicia Morton
 "Maybe / Tomorrow" (Reprise) - Audra McDonald
 "Little Girls" (Reprise) - Kathy Bates
 "Finale: I Don't Need Anything But You" - Victor Garber, Audra McDonald, and Alicia Morton

1999 soundtrack albums
Comedy film soundtracks
Drama film soundtracks
Musical film soundtracks
Little Orphan Annie